The Journal of Thermal Analysis and Calorimetry is a bimonthly peer-reviewed scientific journal published by  Springer Science+Business Media on behalf of Akadémiai Kiadó. It was established in 1969 as the Journal of Thermal Analysis, obtaining its current title in 1998. The journal covers all aspects of calorimetry, thermal analysis, and experimental thermodynamics. The editor-in-chief is I.M. Szilágyi (Budapest University of Technology and Economics).

Abstracting and indexing
The journal is abstracted and indexed in:

According to the Journal Citation Reports, the journal has a 2021 impact factor of 4.755.

References

External links

Physical chemistry journals
Springer Science+Business Media academic journals
Publications established in 1969
English-language journals
Bimonthly journals
Akadémiai Kiadó academic journals